The 1991 Cross River State gubernatorial election occurred on December 14, 1991. NRC candidate Clement Ebri won the election.

Conduct
The gubernatorial election was conducted using an open ballot system. Primaries for the two parties to select their flag bearers were conducted on October 19, 1991.

The election occurred on December 14, 1991. NRC candidate Clement Ebri won the election.

References 

Cross River State gubernatorial elections
Cross River State gubernatorial election
Cross River State gubernatorial election